Yohan Carlos Concepción Flande (born January 27, 1986) is a Dominican professional baseball pitcher who plays for Tren del Norte of the Nicaraguan Professional Baseball League . He formerly played for the Colorado Rockies of Major League Baseball (MLB), and the Samsung Lions of the Korea Baseball Organization (KBO).

Career

Philadelphia Phillies
Flande was signed by the Philadelphia Phillies as an international free agent in 2004. In 2009, he played in the All-Star Futures Game.

Atlanta Braves
After being released by the Phillies, he signed a minor league deal with the Atlanta Braves in December 2010.

Colorado Rockies
He signed a minor league contract with the Colorado Rockies in February 2014.

Flande made his major league debut on June 25, 2014. He pitched five innings, striking out four, and giving up four runs on six hits. 

He was designated for assignment on February 4, 2015. Flande earned his first MLB win on July 28, 2015, vs the Chicago Cubs in a 7–2 Rockies victory. On December 28, 2015, the Rockies re-signed Flande to a minor league deal. In 2015 he gave up the longest home run of any major league pitcher, at 493 feet.

Samsung Lions
Flande signed with the Samsung Lions of the Korea Baseball Organization for the 2016 season.

Rieleros de Aguascalientes
On April 10, 2017, Flande signed with the Rieleros de Aguascalientes of the Mexican Baseball League. He re-signed for 2018 and became a free agent after the season.

Algodoneros de Unión Laguna
On May 27, 2019, Flande signed with the Algodoneros de Unión Laguna of the Mexican League. He was released on July 8, 2019.

References

External links

1986 births
Living people
Albuquerque Isotopes players
Algodoneros de Unión Laguna players
Clearwater Threshers players
Colorado Rockies players
Colorado Springs Sky Sox players
Dominican Republic expatriate baseball players in Mexico
Dominican Republic expatriate baseball players in South Korea
Dominican Republic expatriate baseball players in the United States
Dominican Summer League Phillies players
Florida Complex League Phillies players
Gwinnett Braves players
KBO League pitchers

Major League Baseball pitchers
Major League Baseball players from the Dominican Republic
Mexican League baseball pitchers
Mississippi Braves players
New Britain Rock Cats players
Reading Phillies players
Rieleros de Aguascalientes players
Samsung Lions players
Tigres del Licey players
Toros del Este players
Águilas del Zulia players
Dominican Republic expatriate baseball players in Venezuela
Dominican Republic expatriate baseball players in Nicaragua